Vikingstad is a locality situated in Linköping Municipality, Östergötland County, Sweden with 2,096 inhabitants in 2010.

Riksdag elections

Notable people
Inga-Lill Andersson, actor
Matilda Ekholm, table tennis player
Tage Danielsson, author who has his roots in Vikingstad

References 

Populated places in Östergötland County
Populated places in Linköping Municipality